Antwan Wiggins (born March 6, 1980 in Brooklyn, NY) is an American hip hop recording artist based in Newport News, Virginia. He is known by his stage name Awon. In 2014, along with frequent collaborator Phoniks, he founded Don't Sleep Records. Awon has shared the stage with many hip-hop acts including Little Brother, Common, EPMD, MC Lyte, and Oddisee.

Discography

Solo albums 
 Beautiful Loser (2008)
 For The Grimy (Searching For Soulville) (2013)
 Matte Black Soul (2014)
 Soulapowa (2020)

Albums with Phoniks 
 Return to the Golden Era (2013)
 Return to the Golden Era: The Remixes (2014)
 Knowledge of Self (2015)
 The Actual Proof (2018)
 Nothing Less (2021)

Albums with Dephlow 
 Dephacation (2014)
 Sleep is the Cousin of Death (2017)

Albums with Kameleon Beats 

 Love Supersedes (2010)
 Concentration Gradient (2011)
 Love Supersedes II (2013)
 Brighter Days (2014)

References 

1980 births
American hip hop record producers
American hip hop singers
American male rappers
Living people
Rappers from Brooklyn
Musicians from Newport News, Virginia
21st-century American rappers
Record producers from New York (state)
21st-century American male musicians